Philip, Phillip, or Phil Hughes may refer to:
Philip Hughes (historian) (1895–1967), Roman Catholic priest and historian
Philip Edgcumbe Hughes (1915–1990), Anglican clergyman and New Testament scholar
Philip Joseph Hughes Jr. (born ), convicted American serial killer
G. Philip Hughes (born 1953), American diplomat
Phil Hughes (footballer) (born 1964), Northern Irish football player
Philip Hughes (footballer, born 1981), Irish football player
Phil Hughes (born 1986), American baseball player
Phillip Hughes (1988–2014), Australian cricketer
Phil Hughes (cricketer) (born 1991), English cricketer